Jane Evans may refer to:

 Jane Evans (activist) (1907–2004), American Reform Jewish leader
 Jane Evans (artist) (1946–2012), New Zealand artist